The Transit River is a river in New Zealand, flowing into Milford Sound.

See also
List of rivers of New Zealand

References

Rivers of Fiordland